UBIS (Asia) Public Company Limited (UBIS) is a manufacturer and distributor of sealing compounds, lacquers and coatings used in can production and bottle closure for the food, beverage and general industries based in Thailand. It is listed on the Market for Alternative Investment on 9 May 2007.

History
UBIS (Asia) was established on 17 June 1997 with initial registered capital of 4 million baht. In June 2006, UBIS increased its registered capital to 190 million baht (190 million shares).

In June 2005, Henkel signed license agreement with the company to sale and produce Can End Sealants with UBIS's technology for Europe, Middle East, Africa and America.

References

External links
 UBIS (Asia) official site

Companies established in 1997
Chemical companies of Thailand
Companies listed on the Stock Exchange of Thailand
Manufacturing companies based in Bangkok
1997 establishments in Thailand